The following is a list of canals in the United States:

Transportation canals in operation

This list includes active canals and artificial waterways that are maintained for use by boats. While some abandoned canals and drainage canals have stretches that can be paddled in a small craft like a canoe, these are not included in this list.

The United States also constructed the Panama Canal on territory it controlled.

Abandoned transportation canals

Irrigation, industrial, and drainage canals

Arizona
Central Arizona Project
Salt River Project Canals
Arizona Canal

California
All-American Canal
Back Channel
Beardsley Canal
Buena Vista Canal
California Aqueduct
Calloway Canal
Carrier Canal
Coachella Canal
Colorado River Aqueduct
Contra Costa Canal
Corning Canal
Delta–Mendota Canal
Eastside Canal
Folsom South Canal
Friant-Kern Canal
Glenn Colusa Canal
Inter-California Canal
Kern Island Canal
Los Angeles Aqueduct
Madera Canal
Orland South Canal
Orland North Canal
Pioneer Canal
Putah South Canal
Stine Canal
Tehama Colusa Canal

Florida
Hillsboro Canal
Miami Canal
North New River Canal
Tamiami Canal
West Palm Beach Canal

Hawaii
Waiolama Canal, Hilo

Idaho
New York Canal

Illinois
North Shore Channel (popular for canoeing and kayaking)

Louisiana
17th Street Canal
Carondelet Canal
Florida Canal
London Avenue Canal
New Orleans Outfall Canals
Orleans Canal
Washington-Palmetto Canal

Massachusetts
Holyoke Canal System
Lowell Power Canal System

Michigan
Edison Sault Power Canal

Nebraska
Loup Canal

New Jersey
Cape May Canal
Delaware and Raritan Canal
Dundee Canal
Morris Canal
Point Pleasant Canal
Raritan Water Power Canal
Washington Canal

Texas
American Canal
Franklin Canal
Riverside Canal (El Paso) (Texas)
Texas Irrigation Canals

Natural inlets called canals
Lynn Canal and Portland Canal in Alaska and Hood Canal in Washington are natural inlets that use the name canal.

Canals by state

These are man made canals in each state that have been given a name and may consist of a narrow irrigation or drainage ditch to a large ship, municipal water and/or irrigation canal. States with extensive agricultural acreage may have many hundred to thousands of canals. USGS Topographical map numbers and latitudes and longitudes of each canal, usable as inputs into Google, Bing, etc. maps, are usually given.

References

See also
List of canals
 Sheep Creek

 
Canals
United States
Canals
Canals